Otopoma is a genus of land snails, terrestrial gastropod mollusks in the subfamily Cyclophorinae of the family Cyclophoridae.

Species 
Species in the genus Otopoma include:
 Otopoma anaglyptum Morelet, 1886
 † Otopoma burgundiae (J. Martin, 1866) 
 † Otopoma cadurcense (Noulet, 1854) 
 † Otopoma carthusianum (Martin, 1866) 
 † Otopoma filholi Filhol, 1877 
 Otopoma foliaceum (Gmelin, 1791)
 Otopoma revoili (Bourguignat, 1882)
Taxa inquirenda
 Otopoma artuffeli Jousseaume, 1882 
 Otopoma blennus Benson, 1856 
 Otopoma flexilabrum (G. B. Sowerby I, 1843)
Synonyms
 Otopoma aequatorium Morelet, 1890: synonym of Tropidophora aequatoria (Morelet, 1890) (original combination)
 Otopoma anaglyptum Morelet, 1890: synonym of Tropidophora anaglypta (Morelet, 1890) (original combination)
 Otopoma bentianum Melvill, 1895: synonym of Rochebrunia bentiana (Melvill, 1895) (original combination)
 Otopoma blennus Benson, 1859: synonym of Pollicaria gravida (Benson, 1856)
 Otopoma clathratulum (Récluz, 1843): synonym of Socotora clathratula (Récluz, 1843) (new combination)
 Otopoma clausum Benson, 1859: synonym of Otopoma hinduorum W. T. Blanford, 1864: synonym of Rochebrunia hinduorum (W. T. Blanford, 1864) (incorrect identification )
 Otopoma complanatum Godwin-Austen, 1881: synonym of Socotora albicans albicans (G. B. Sowerby I, 1839) (junior synonym)
 Otopoma conicum Godwin-Austen, 1881: synonym of Dioscopoma conicum conicum (Godwin-Austen, 1881) (original name)
 Otopoma consimile Melvill & Ponsonby, 1896: synonym of Rochebrunia dhofarense (Melvill & Ponsonby, 1896) (junior synonym)
 Otopoma dhofarense Melvill & Ponsonby, 1896: synonym of Rochebrunia dhofarense (Melvill & Ponsonby, 1896) (original combination)
 † Otopoma divionense (Martin, 1866) : synonym of † Georgia divionensis (J. Martin, 1866) 
 Otopoma hadramauticum Melvill & Ponsonby, 1896: synonym of Rochebrunia bentiana (Melvill, 1895) (junior synonym)
 Otopoma hinduorum W. T. Blanford, 1864: synonym of Rochebrunia hinduorum (W. T. Blanford, 1864) (original combination)
 Otopoma humbloti Morelet, 1886: synonym of Tropidophora humbloti (Morelet, 1886) (original combination)
 Otopoma macgregoriae Hedley, 1894: synonym of Dominamaria macgregoriae (Hedley, 1894) (original combination)
 Otopoma naticoides (Récluz, 1843): synonym of Socotora naticoides (Récluz, 1843)
 Otopoma obtusum L. Pfeiffer, 1862: synonym of Rochebrunia obtusa (L. Pfeiffer, 1862) (original combination)
 Otopoma perrieri Bourguignat, 1881: synonym of Rochebrunia perrieri (Bourguignat, 1881) (original combination)
 Otopoma philippianum L. Pfeiffer, 1852: synonym of Tropidophora philippiana (L. Pfeiffer, 1852) (original combination)
 Otopoma poirieri Bourguignat, 1881: synonym of Rochebrunia perrieri (Bourguignat, 1881) (junior synonym)
 Otopoma polyzonatum Morelet, 1886: synonym of Tropidophora polyzonata (Morelet, 1886) (original combination)
 † Otopoma triexaratum (J. Martin, 1866) : synonym of † Georgia (Arabia) triexarata (J. Martin, 1866)

References 

 Neubert, E. (2003). Otopoma Gray 1850 — a few words to add to a 150 years old debate. Archiv für Molluskenkunde, 132 (1/2): 93–96. Frankfurt am Main.
 Bank, R. A. (2017). Classification of the Recent terrestrial Gastropoda of the World. Last update: July 16, 2017

External links
 Gray J.E. (1850). Nomenclature of molluscous animals and shells in the collection of the British Museum. Part I. Cyclophoridae. 68 pp, London

Cyclophoridae
Gastropod genera